Jonathan Elmer (November 29, 1745September 3, 1817) was an American politician, of the Pro-Administration (Federalist) Party.

Early life
Jonathan Elmer was born in Cedarville, New Jersey, in 1745. He was the son of Reverend Daniel Elmer and Abigail (Lawrence) Elmer. He was privately tutored until 1765, when he began attendance in the first class of medical students at the University of Pennsylvania.  He received the degree of bachelor of medicine in 1768, and 1771 he received his doctor of medicine degree, the first awarded by an American university.

Early career
Elmer practiced medicine in Bridgeton and became active in government and politics.  From 1772 to 1775, he served as sheriff of Cumberland County. During the American Revolutionary War he was a militia officer and attained the rank of captain as commander of a company. He was elected to the American Philosophical Society in 1774.

Later career
Elmer was a delegate to the Continental Congress three times: 1777 to 1778, 1781 to 1783, and 1787 to 1788. In 1780 and 1784 he represented Cumberland County in the New Jersey Legislative Council.  The College of New Jersey (now known as Princeton University) made Elmer a trustee in 1782.  He served in that position until 1795.  The New Jersey Legislature appointed Elmer to the United States Senate for the term of March 4, 1789 to March 3, 1791.

His health declined after that, and Elmer died in 1817, and he was interred in Old Broad Street Presbyterian Church Cemetery in Bridgeton.

Family
In 1769, Elmer married Mary Seeley, the daughter of Colonel Ephraim Seeley of Bridgeton.  They were the parents of eight children.

Elmer's younger brother, Ebenezer Elmer, and Ebenezer's son Lucius Elmer were members of the United States House of Representatives.

References

http://search.credoreference.com/content/entry/rutgersnj/elmer_jonathan_b_nov_29_1745_d_sept_3_1817/0

External links
Jonathan Elmer at The Political Graveyard

1745 births
1817 deaths
People from Lawrence Township, Cumberland County, New Jersey
People of colonial New Jersey
American people of English descent
American Presbyterians
Continental Congressmen from New Jersey
Pro-Administration Party United States senators from New Jersey
Members of the New Jersey Legislative Council
New Jersey sheriffs
18th-century American physicians
University of Pennsylvania alumni
Princeton University people
Burials in New Jersey
Members of the American Philosophical Society